Bohara, also known as Bohora or Bohara, is a Brahmin (bahun) and Chhetri surname of the Khas community of Nepal.

Bohara belonged to Thar Ghar aristocracy group which assisted the rulers of Gorkha Kingdom. In western Nepal, the Bohara title is in use from Katyuri  Kingdom of Doti, Joshimath and Askot by the Kshatriyas, at the time of old  Feudal kingdom system of around 12th century (also known as Jamindari Pratha).

Largely, the Bohara title is used by the Chhetri community. Some janajati (Sauka), bahun , Dalits, and Kami also use this surname. This surname is also found in Brahmins, vaishya, dalits and panjabi people of Himachal Pradesh,Rajisthan Uttar Pradesh, and Uttarakhand states of India.

Notable people with surname Bohara
Notable Bohora/Bohara include:
<--!Only add people who have their own English Wikipedia article-->
Amrit Kumar Bohara, CPN-UML politician; former Minister of Nepal
Moti Lal Bohara, former Inspector General of Nepal Police
Ram Bahadur Bohara, politician; former Member of Parliament, Nepal
Avinash Bohara, Nepalese cricketer

References 

Nepali-language surnames
Khas surnames